Mike Stroud may refer to:
Mike Stroud (physician) (born 1955), British physician and explorer
Mike Stroud (musician), guitarist in the New York electronic rock duo Ratatat